Léon Devos may refer to:

 Léon Devos (artist) (1897–1974), Belgian painter
 Léon Devos (cyclist) (1896–1963), Belgian racing cyclist